Cycling at the 2008 Summer Paralympics consisted of 44 events in two main disciplines, track cycling and road cycling. Track cycling was held in Laoshan Velodrome on 7–10 September, and road cycling took place at the Changping Triathlon Venue on 12–14 September.

Classification
Cyclists are given a classification depending on the type and extent of their disability. The classification system allows cyclists to compete against others with a similar level of function.

Cycling classes are:
B&VI 1–3: Blind and visually impaired cyclists
LC 1–4: Cyclists with a locomotor disability
CP 1–4: Cyclists with cerebral palsy
HC A, B, and C: Cyclists using a handcycle

Events
For each of the events below, medals are contested for one or more of the above classifications. After each classification is given the dates that the event will be contested.

Road cycling
Men's individual road race
 B&VI 1–3 – 14 September
 HC B – 14 September
 HC C – 14 September
 LC 1–2/CP 4 – 13 September
 LC 3–4/CP 3 – 13 September
Men's individual time trial
 B&VI 1–3 – 12 September
 CP 3 – 12 September
 CP 4 – 12 September
 HC A – 12 September
 HC B – 12 September
 HC C – 12 September
 LC 1 – 12 September
 LC 2 – 12 September
 LC 3 – 12 September
 LC 4 – 12 September
Women's individual road race
 B&VI 1–3 – 14 September
 HC A/B/C – 13 September
Women's individual time trial
 B&VI 1–3 – 12 September
 HC A/B/C – 12 September
 LC 1–2/CP 4 – 12 September
 LC 3–4/CP 3 – 12 September
Mixed individual road race
 CP 1–2 – 13 September
Mixed individual time trial
 CP 1–2 – 12 September

Track cycling
Men's 1 km time trial
 B&VI 1–3 – 8 September
 CP 3 – 9 September
 CP 4 – 9 September
 LC 1 – 9 September
 LC 2 – 9 September
 LC 3–4 – 7 September
Men's individual pursuit
 B&VI 1–3 – 4000 m – 7 September
 CP 3 – 3000 m – 7 September
 CP 4 – 3000 m – 7 September
 LC 1 – 4000 m – 8 September
 LC 2 – 4000 m – 8 September
 LC 3 – 9 September
 LC 4 – 9 September
Men's individual sprint
 B&VI 1–3 – 10 September
Men's team sprint
 LC 1–4/CP 3–4 – 10 September
Women's 500m time trial
 LC1–2/CP 4 – 8 September
 LC3–4/CP 3 – 8 September
Women's 1 km time trial
 B&VI 1–3 – 7 September
Women's individual pursuit
 B&VI 1–3 – 9 September
 LC 1–2/CP 4 – 10 September
 LC 3–4/CP 3 – 10 September

Participating countries
There were 220 athletes (163 males, 57 females) from 39 nations taking part in this sport.

Medal summary

Medal table

This ranking sorts countries by the number of gold medals earned by their cyclists (in this context a country is an entity represented by a National Paralympic Committee). The number of silver medals is taken into consideration next and then the number of bronze medals. If, after the above, countries are still tied, equal ranking is given and they are listed alphabetically.

Road cycling

Men's events

Women's events

Mixed events

Track cycling

Men's events

Women's events

See also
Cycling at the 2008 Summer Olympics

References

External links
Official site of the 2008 Summer Paralympics
IPC
UCI:Union Cycliste Internationale
Results Book – Road
Results Book – Track

 
2008
2008 Summer Paralympics events
Paralympics
2008 in road cycling
2008 in track cycling
International cycle races hosted by China